Fusolatirus paetelianus is a species of sea snail, a marine gastropod mollusc in the family Fasciolariidae, the spindle snails, the tulip snails and their allies.

Description

Distribution

References

 Snyder M.A. & Bouchet P. (2006) New species and new records of deep-water Fusolatirus (Neogastropoda: Fasciolariidae) from the West Pacific. Journal of Conchology 39(1): 1-12

External links
 Küster, H. C. & Kobelt, W. (1844-1876). Die geschwäntzen unbewehrten Purpurschnecken. Erste Hälfte: Turbinella und Fasciolaria. In Abbildungen nach der Natur mit Beschreibungen. Mollusca Gasteropoda: Purpuracea: Purpurschnecken; Dritte Abtheilung. Systematisches Conchylien-Cabinet von Martini und Chemnitz, ed.2, 3(3[1)]
 Hedley, C. (1912). Descriptions of some new or noteworthy shells in the Australian Museum. Records of the Australian Museum. 8(3): 131-160, pls 40-45

Fasciolariidae
Gastropods described in 1874